ARM Inamul Haque (October 1, 1921 – November 11, 1977; Dhaka, Bangladesh) was a Bangladeshi engineer, veteran and social worker. He is the first Bangladeshi posthumous eye donor.

Early life and education
Born in Rajkhola area, Howrah district, West Bengal on October 1, 1921, Haque completed Engineering from Bangladesh University of Engineering and Technology (BUET). In 1946, he achieved a masterpiece engineering degree with great achievement. He was one of the founders of the Bangladesh Diabetic Association and the Founding General Secretary of Dhanmondi Club (now Sheikh Jamal Dhanmondi Club).

Career
Inamul Haque started his career by joining the Ahsanullah Engineering College (now BUET) in the teaching in 1946. Three years before his death, Haque made his will and donated his eyes. One of his corneas was added to the eye of the Weekly 2000 editor Shahadat Chowdhury and the other was added to the eye of a person named Ramjan Ali.

References 

1921 births
1977 deaths
Bangladeshi engineers
Bangladesh University of Engineering and Technology alumni
20th-century engineers
People from Dhaka
Pakistani engineers